Jordan Kent Macdonald Brown (born 12 September 1980) is a Canadian politician, who was elected to the Legislative Assembly of Prince Edward Island in the 2015 provincial election. He represented the electoral district of Charlottetown-Brighton as a member of the Liberal Party until his defeat in the 2019 Prince Edward Island general election.

Brown studied business and economics at the University of Prince Edward Island, before attending law school at the University of New Brunswick. He was called to the bar in 2005, and practised law in Charlottetown. He is married to Amy Boswall, and has two children.

His election was notable in that he defeated Rob Lantz, the leader of the opposing Progressive Conservative Party, by 22 votes, and thus denied him a seat in the legislature. This ultimately led to Lantz's resigning the party leadership.

On October 23, 2017, Brown was appointed to the Executive Council of Prince Edward Island as Minister of Education, Early Learning and Culture. On January 10, 2018, Brown was given additional roles in cabinet as Minister of Justice and Public Safety, and Attorney General.

Brown was also a member of the Standing Committee on Education and Economic Development and the Standing Committee on Health and Wellness. He previously served as a member of the Standing Committee on Public Accounts.

References

Living people
Members of the Executive Council of Prince Edward Island
People from Charlottetown
Prince Edward Island Liberal Party MLAs
University of New Brunswick Faculty of Law alumni
University of Prince Edward Island alumni
21st-century Canadian politicians
1980 births